MasterChef Thailand is a Thai competitive cooking reality show, based on the original British series of MasterChef, open to amateur and home chefs. Produced by Heliconia H Group, It debuted on June 4, 2017, on Channel 7 and Channel 7 HD.

Format
MasterChef Thailand is based on the BBC British version of MasterChef.

In the first few episodes, the initial home cooks would undergo a final audition that varies season-by-season:
 Season 1: The home cooks would prepare a signature dish for the judges to taste. They would need at least 2 "yes" votes from the judges to move on. Those home cooks would then be trimmed down to about sixteen challenges via a skill test (such as dicing and slicing gingers) and an invention test, where they have to create a dish with a main ingredient being used.
 Season 2 and Season 3: The home cooks would undergo two invention tests to determine the final set of contestants to compete for the rest of the season.
 Season 4: The home cooks would participate in the battle for a white apron, where home cooks are pitted together, based on their skills, to compete for a white apron. Home cooks who lost the battles are invited for a second chance to win the apron by a team challenge and a pressure test.
 Season 5: The home cooks would undergo two skill tests, with the home cooks who made a mistake being eliminated on-the-spot. Some of the eliminated home cooks are invited back for a second chance to win the apron by a team challenge and an invention test.

Subsequently, the formal competition begins typically following a 4-event cycle that takes place over 2 episodes, with one chef eliminated after the second and fourth event. The events typically are: 
 Mystery Box: Contestants were given the same ingredients and must use only those ingredients to make a dish within an amount of time given. The winner of this event will be given an advantage in the next event.
 Invention Test: The judges take the mystery box winner to the pantry, privately explain the theme of the elimination test, and tell of at least one advantage. The advantage is typically the choosing of the main ingredient for the invention test. Other advantages include, more shopping time, choosing a specific ingredient for each contestants, or immunity. The rest then asked to invent a dish based on the main ingredient. The top 2 contestants will be the team captain of the next team challenge. Then, the judges nominate at least three contestants for elimination, with one being eliminated and asked to "leave the MasterChef Kitchen", leaving their apron at their station.
 Team Challenge: The contestants usually are taken to an off-site location where they will be split into 2 teams, red and blue, with the winner of the invention test choosing first. Then, the team are tasked to prepare and serve a meal to a number of diners in a limited amount of time. The team that has the most votes from the diners are the winners of the challenge, with the losing team having to compete in the pressure test when they're back at the MasterChef Kitchen.
 Pressure Test: The losing team of the previous challenge are tasked to recreate the dish given by the judges in a fixed amount of time. Sometimes, not all of the losing team contestants will compete in this round in which someone receiving an exemption given by either the team captain or the judges. Each dish is judged based on the taste, the appearance, and sometimes, the accuracy of the dish. The contestant that performed the worst in the event will be eliminated from the competition.

Other events that rarely happen during the competition include:
 Reinstation challenge: The eliminated contestants competed in a special mystery box challenge and pressure test. The contestant that wins both rounds will be reinstated back in the competition.
 Tag-team challenge: A variation of the team challenge. The contestants are divided into either pairs or teams. They are usually asked to recreate a dish given by the judges. The contestants in the team must switch every time the judges asked them to switch. (typically every 15 minutes) The winning team of the challenge will be the team captains in the team challenge, with the losing team being up for elimination.

This cycle continues until there's 2-4 chefs remaining. The winner will receive ฿1,000,000, their own MasterChef cookbook, and the MasterChef trophy.

Hosts and judges

Seasons

Season synopsis

Season 1: 2017

The first season of MasterChef Thailand was broadcast between 4 June 2017 and 24 September 2017. Applications for contestants closed on 8 April 2017, with subsequent auditions held in Bangkok.

Season 2: 2018

The second season of MasterChef Thailand was broadcast between 4 February 2018 and 27 May 2018. Applications for contestants were opened on 25 September 2017, a day after the first season ended.

Season 3: 2019

The third season of MasterChef Thailand was broadcast between 3 February 2019 and 9 June 2019. Applications for contestants were opened on 16 December 2018, a day after the first season of Masterchef Junior ended.

Season 4: 2021

The fourth season of MasterChef Thailand is currently broadcasting started on 21 February 2021. Applications for contestants were opened on 6 December 2020, as the first season of MasterChef Celebrity was broadcasting at the time.

Season 5: 2022

Spin-off editions

All Stars: 2020

Celebrity Season 1: 2020

Celebrity Season 2: 2021

Awards

See also
MasterChef Junior Thailand
MasterChef Thailand All-Stars

References

External links

 
Thai reality television series
2010s Thai television series
2017 Thai television series debuts
Thai television series based on British television series
Channel 7 (Thailand) original programming